Peter Sinclair (13 November 1887 – 8 March 1938) was a Liberal party member of the House of Commons of Canada. He was born in Summerfield, Prince Edward Island and became a farmer.

The son of Peter Sinclair and Margaret MacMurdo, Sinclair was educated in Springfield and farmed near Charlottetown.

Sinclair was a Liberal member of the Legislative Assembly of Prince Edward Island from 1927 until his defeat in the 1931 election, at the 1st Queens riding.

He was first elected to Parliament at the Queen's riding in the 1935 general election. Sinclair died on 8 March 1938 before completing his term in the 18th Canadian Parliament.

References

External links
 

1887 births
1938 deaths
Canadian farmers
Members of the House of Commons of Canada from Prince Edward Island
Liberal Party of Canada MPs
Prince Edward Island Liberal Party MLAs